Common tiger may refer to:

 Ictinogomphus ferox, a dragonfly of Africa
 Danaus genutia, a butterfly of India, also called the striped tiger
 Danaus melanippus, a butterfly of tropical Asia, also called the black veined tiger
 Danaus plexippus, a butterfly of North America, also called the monarch

See also
 Tiger

Animal common name disambiguation pages